Dolichopus ovatus is a species in the family Dolichopodidae ("longlegged flies"), in the order Diptera ("flies").

References

Further reading

External links

ovatus
Taxa named by Hermann Loew
Insects described in 1861